The monastery was originally developed in 1942 during WWII by Gerald Heard, a disciple of Swami Prabhavananda of the Vedanta Society of Southern California an American branch of the Ramakrishna Order of India. Established as Trabuco College, it was originally meant to be a religious, non-sectarian, co-ed monastery, unaffiliated with any particular religious organization. Aldous Huxley, a close friend of Heard, spent 6 weeks there working on his book The Perennial Philosophy.

However, the experiment failed and Heard donated the land and buildings to the Vedanta Society of Southern California as a male-only monastery. It was consecrated on September 7, 1949, by Swami Prabhavananda, as the Ramakrishna Monastery. It is located on a 40-acre property in the rolling hills of Trabuco Canyon, California. It bears the name of the great Indian mystic, Sri Ramakrishna, founder of the Ramakrishna Order of India.

References

External links 
 Ramakrishna Monastery, Trabuco Canyon - details

Orange County, California
Hindu temples in California
Indian-American culture in California
Religious buildings and structures in Orange County, California
1949 establishments in California
Buildings and structures in Orange County, California
Hinduism in the United States